The following is a list of Arab rappers.

See also

  Lists of musicians

References

 
Lists of musicians by genre
Lists of singers
Rappers
 
Lists of hip hop musicians